Pitcairnia venezuelana is a plant species in the genus Pitcairnia. This species is endemic to Venezuela.

References

External links
 Pitcirnia venezuelana photos, from the FCBS Bromeliad Photo Index Database

venezuelana
Flora of Venezuela